Fairfield School is a Primary and Intermediate school in Dunedin, New Zealand.

The school was established during the late 19th century in the suburb of Fairfield by William Martin. It is situated on Sickels Street near the Dunedin Southern Motorway.

The school has restricted enrolment to a limited geographical zone to reduce class sizes.

Notes

Educational institutions established in 1872
Intermediate schools in New Zealand
Primary schools in New Zealand
Schools in Dunedin
1872 establishments in New Zealand